Carlsberg Architectural Prize was an architecture award founded by the Danish New Carlsberg foundation in 1991. It was awarded three times between the years 1992–1998 “To recognize excellence in lasting architectural design”.  Her Majesty The Queen of Denmark acted as the patron of the prize. At the time of its foundation in 1991 the prize, being worth $235,000 was the biggest in the field of architecture. The first recipient, Tadao Ando, donated the prize money for the Osaka Prefectural Government, later used to establish the Ando Fund administered by the Osaka Foundation of International Exchange.

Laureates 
 1992 - Tadao Ando
 1995 - Juha Leiviskä
 1998 - Peter Zumthor

References 

Architecture awards
Awards established in 1991
1991 establishments in Denmark
Awards disestablished in 1998
Danish awards
Carlsberg Group